Jacopo Sadoleto (July 12, 1477 – October 18, 1547) was an Italian Catholic cardinal and counterreformer noted for his correspondence with and opposition to John Calvin.

Life
He was born at Modena in 1477, the son of a noted jurist, he acquired reputation as a neo-Latin poet, his best-known piece being one on the group of Laocoön. In Rome, he obtained the patronage of Cardinal Carafa and adopted the ecclesiastical career. Pope Leo X chose him as his secretary along with Pietro Bembo, and in 1517 made him bishop of Carpentras.

A faithful servant of the papacy in many negotiations under successive popes, especially as a peacemaker, his major aim was to win back the Protestants by peaceful persuasion and by putting Catholic doctrine in a conciliatory form.  Sadoleto was a diligent bishop, made cardinal in 1536, given the titular church of San Callisto.

In 1539 Cardinal Sadoleto wrote to the people of Geneva, urging them to return to the Catholic faith. John Calvin had been asked to leave Geneva the previous year, and was living in Strasbourg, but the Genevans still asked Calvin to write a response to Sadoleto, which he did.

Sadoleto died in Rome in 1547, aged 70.

Works
Sadoleto's collected works appeared at Mainz in 1607, and include, besides his theological-ironical pieces, a collection of Epistles, a treatise on education (first published in 1533), and the Phaedrus, a defence of philosophy, written in 1538. The best collection is that published at Verona (1737–1738); it includes the life by Fiordibello.

 His chief work, a Commentary on Romans, meant as an antidote against the new Protestant doctrines, gave great offence at Rome and Paris:

References

Bibliography

Pericaud, Antoine. Fragments biographiques sur Jacob Sadolet (Lyon, 1849)

External links 
 

1477 births
1547 deaths
Italian Renaissance humanists
16th-century Italian cardinals
New Latin-language poets
Bishops of Carpentras
16th-century Italian Roman Catholic bishops